Fahd Jassem al-Freij (born 17 January 1950) is the former Minister of Defense of Syria, took office on 18 July 2012 and left office on 1 January 2018.

Early life and education
Freij was born in Rahjan in a Sunni Arab tribe on 17 January 1950. He joined the Syrian Arab Army in 1968, and graduated as an armoured corps lieutenant from the Homs Military Academy in 1971.

Freij attended different courses and a higher military education:

 Bachelor in Military Sciences, Armoured Officer, Homs Military Academy, in 1971,
 Staff Course, 
 Airborne paratroops course,
 General Command and Staff Course,
 Higher Staff Course (War Course).

Career
On 8 August 2011, Freij was appointed Chief of Staff of the Syrian Arab Army during the Syrian civil war. In December 2011, defected Syrian Army officers reported that prior to his appointment of Chief of Staff, al-Freij commanded the Syrian Army Special Forces in the regions of Daraa, Idlib and Hama during the Syrian uprising.

However, on 18 July 2012, after Defense Minister Dawoud Rajiha was assassinated in the 2012 Damascus bombing, Freij was appointed by Bashar al-Assad to succeed Rajiha. He was also named as Deputy Commander-in-Chief of the Army and the Armed Forces.

On 1 January 2018, Lieutenant General Ali Abdullah Ayyoub was the successor of al-Freij as Minister of Defense.

References

1950 births
Living people
Syrian Sunni Muslims
Syrian ministers of defense
Chiefs of Staff of the Syrian Army
People of the Syrian civil war
Members of the Regional Command of the Arab Socialist Ba'ath Party – Syria Region
People from Hama Governorate